Coleophora parilis is a moth of the family Coleophoridae. It is found in Inner Mongolia, China.

The wingspan is 8.5-13.5 mm. The species is nocturnal.

References

parilis
Moths of Asia
Moths described in 2005